The 2014–15 FC Ufa season was the club's 1st season in the Russian Premier League, the highest tier of association football in Russia, and 4th in total. Ufa will also be taking part in the Russian Cup.

Squad

Out on Loan

Transfers

Summer

In:

Out:

Winter

In:

Out:

Competitions

Russian Premier League

Results by round

Matches

League table

Russian Cup

Squad statistics

Appearances and goals

|-
|colspan="14"|Players away from the club on loan:

|-
|colspan="14"|Players who appeared for Ufa no longer at the club:

|}

Goal Scorers

Disciplinary record

Notes 

 YEKT time changed from UTC+6 to UTC+5 permanently on 26 October 2014.

References

FC Ufa seasons
Ufa